Henri Kontinen and John Peers were the defending champions but chose to compete in Tokyo instead.

Łukasz Kubot and Marcelo Melo won the title, defeating Oliver Marach and Mate Pavić in the final, 6–1, 6–4.

Seeds

Draw

Draw

Qualifying

Seeds

Qualifiers
  Denys Molchanov /  Igor Zelenay

Qualifying draw

References
 Main Draw
 Qualifying Draw

2018 ATP World Tour
2018 China Open (tennis)